NRL Tasmania (abbreviated as NRLTas, and formerly the Tasmanian Rugby League) is the organisation responsible for administering the game of rugby league in the Australian state of Tasmania. Tasmania is an affiliated State of the overall Australian governing body, the Australian Rugby League.

History

20th Century
The Tasmanian Rugby League was founded at a meeting at Heathorn's Hotel, Hobart on 2 December 1953 and the first competition was held in 1954 with teams including Bellerive (Eastern Suburbs), Taroona, Newtown and Canterbury. Players were initially recruited from Hobart Rugby Union teams and the first matches were played on 3 April 1954 at the South St Grounds, Bellerive. The first premiership was won by Taroona 
 The first interstate match was played against Victoria on 12 June 1954 with Tasmania winning 18-8.

1990s Golden Era
By the mid 1990s the Tasmanian Rugby League was running a statewide competition which included Six Hobart teams:
 Glenorchy Stingrays (Saints using st george kit)
 Panthers (possibly Sandy Bay Panthers)
Eastern Suburbs Eagles
 Northern Suburbs Tigers (not connected to the current Hobart Tigers)
 Hobart City Falcons
 Derwent Valley Sharks 
and three regional teams:
 Launceston Clippers (the Australian Maritime College)
 North-West Warriors (Based in Ulverstone)
 Smithton Bulls
The Tasmanian Rugby League also ran a Northern Tasmanian vs Southern Tasmanian competition during this period. Ben McKinnon from the Launceston Clippers is the only player to have won the statewide best + fairest on two occasions both in his debut season in 1995 and then again in 1997.

Due to dwindling player numbers the competition contracted to four Hobart teams during the early 2000s and midway through the 2003-04 season the senior amateur competition folded as a result of rising public liability insurance costs.

2009 Rebirth
In late 2009 a new senior competition was established through the efforts of local 7HO FM Radio Personality Jason 'Wolfie' Wolfgram (President 2009/10), in conjunction with ARL Rugby League Development Officer, Graham McNaney. The decision to re-establish the competition followed a public forum at the Hotel Grand Chancellor in Hobart on Thursday 25 June 2009.

The revised summer competition initially included four teams:
 Hobart Tigers
 Northern Suburbs Cowboys (formerly named Broncos)
 Eastern Shore Thunder and
 Southern Rabbitohs
Gala Days and Under 17s junior exhibition matches have also been a feature of the revised competition. In February 2012 a National Rugby League trial match between Brisbane Broncos and Melbourne Storm was held in Hobart. Another Storm trial was held in Tasmania in 2017 against the Canterbury-Bankstown Bulldogs.

The Launceston Warriors were admitted to the competition during the 2012-13 season. A North West Coast Titans team joined the competition in 2013-2014 representing North West Tasmania.

The competition folded in 2014 from a lack of players and support.

Continued Hiatus and Lack of Action 
NRL Tasmania is currently controlled by NRL Victoria as a cost-saving mechanism due to the low popularity of the sport in Tasmania. This has caused widespread controversy however, with many rugby league fans believing the code does not place any value in Tasmania.

No competitive activity has taken place since 2014.

Tasmanian Rugby League Premiership 
The Tasmanian Rugby League Premiership was reborn in 2009. 
Over its course, the competition consisted of 7 teams at various times:
 Claremont Cowboys
 Hobart Tigers
 Launceston Warriors
 North West Coast Titans
 Northern Suburbs Broncos/Cowboys
 South Hobart Storm (Formally Eastern Shore Thunder)
 Southern Rabbitohs

Premierships

Representative Team 

Tasmanian Rugby League team is the representative team of the Tasmanian Rugby League. They have competed in many competitions since their first game in 1954, most notably in the Affiliated States Championship (sometimes combined with South Australia.

See also

Tasmanian Rugby Union

References

External links
 
 

Ru
Rugby league governing bodies in Australia
Rugby league in Tasmania
1953 establishments in Australia
Sports organizations established in 1953